Maquimaquiyoc (possibly from Quechua maki hand, maki maki a kind of tree with fingered leaves (Oreopanax incisus), -yuq a suffix, "the one with the maki maki tree) is a mountain in the eastern extensions of the Urubamba mountain range in the Andes of Peru, about  high. It is located in the Cusco Region, Calca Province, Calca District. It lies east of Coscojahuarina and southeast of Huamanchoque and Pitusiray.

References 

Mountains of Peru
Mountains of Cusco Region